The Association of Tennis Professionals (ATP) Tour is the elite professional tennis circuit organised by the ATP tour. The 2000 ATP Tour calendar comprises the Grand Slam tournaments (supervised by the International Tennis Federation (ITF)), the tennis event at the 2000 Summer Olympics, the Tennis Masters Series, the ATP International Series Gold, the ATP International Series, the ATP World Team Cup, the Tennis Masters Cup and the ATP Tour World Doubles Championships. Also included in the 2000 calendar are the Davis Cup and the Hopman Cup, which do not distribute ranking points, and are both organised by the ITF.

Schedule 
Schedule of events on the 2000 calendar, with player progression documented from the quarterfinals stage.

Key

January

February

March

April

May

June

July

August

September

October

November

December

Statistical information 
These tables present the number of singles (S), doubles (D), and mixed doubles (X) titles won by each player and each nation during the season, within all the tournament categories of the 2000 ATP Tour: the Grand Slam tournaments, the tennis event at the Summer Olympics, the year-end championships (Tennis Masters Cup and ATP Tour World Doubles Championships), the Tennis Masters Series, the ATP International Series Gold, and the ATP International Series. The players/nations are sorted by: 1) total number of titles (a doubles title won by two players representing the same nation counts as only one win for the nation); 2) cumulated importance of those titles (one Grand Slam win equalling two Masters Series wins, one year-end championships equalling one-and-a-half Masters Series win, one Olympics win or Masters Series win equalling two International Series Gold wins, one International Series Gold win equalling two International Series wins); 3) a singles > doubles > mixed doubles hierarchy; 4) alphabetical order (by family names for players).

Key

Titles won by player

Titles won by nation

ATP rankings 
These are the ATP rankings of the top twenty singles players, doubles players, and the top ten doubles teams on the ATP Tour, at the end of the 1999 ATP Tour, and of the 2000 season, with number of rankings points, number of tournaments played, year-end ranking in 1999, highest and lowest position during the season (for singles and doubles individual only, as doubles team rankings are not calculated over a rolling year-to-date system), and number of spots gained or lost from the 1999 to the 2000 year-end rankings.

Singles

Doubles (Individual)

Doubles (Team)

Retirements 
Following is a list of notable players (winners of a main tour title, and/or part of the ATP rankings top 100 (singles) or top 50 (doubles) for at least one week) who announced their retirement from professional tennis, became inactive (after not playing for more than 52 weeks), or were permanently banned from playing, during the 2000 season:

  Neil Broad (born 20 November 1966 in Cape Town, South Africa) He turned professional in 1986 and reached his career-high doubles ranking of world no. 9 in 1990. He reached the semifinals of the Australian Open in 1990, the quarterfinals of Wimbledon in 1997, and the quarterfinals of the US Open in 1998. He earned seven career doubles titles and a silver medal at the 1996 Olympics. He played his last career match at Wimbledon partnering Arvind Parmar.
  Andrei Cherkasov (born July 4, 1970, in Ufa, USSR) He turned professional in 1988 and reached his career-high singles ranking of no. 13 in 1991. He reached the quarterfinals of the Australian Open in 1990, the French Open in 1992, and the US Open in 1990. He won a bronze medal in the 1992 Olympics.
  Jim Courier (born August 17, 1970, in Sanford, Florida) He turned professional in 1988 and became world no. 1 in 1992. He won the Australian Open in 1992 and 1993, the French Open in 1991 and 1992, and was a finalist at Wimbledon in 1993 and the US Open in 1991, as well as the year-end finals in 1991 and 1992. He was also ranked no. 20 in doubles and earned six career doubles titles. His last career match was at the Miami Masters in March against Thomas Enqvist.
  Marcelo Filippini (born 4 August 1967, in Montevideo, Uruguay) He became a professional in 1987 and reached his career-high ranking of world no. 30 in 1990. He reached the quarterfinals of the Australian Open and earned five career titles. He was also ranking no. 34 in doubles and earned 3 titles. His last match was in Kitzbühel in July against Bohdan Ulihrach.
  Petr Korda (born 23 January 1968 in Prague, Czechoslovakia) He turned professional in 1997 and reached a career-high ranking of world no. 2 in 1998. He won the Australian Open in 1998, was a finalist at the French Open and a quarterfinalist at Wimbledon and the US Open. He earned 10 career ATP titles. He played his last career match in Prague in December against Martin Hromec.
  Nicklas Kulti (born 22 April 1971 in Stockholm, Sweden) He turned professional in 1989 and reached his career-high ranking of world no. 32 in 1993. He reached the quarterfinals at the French Open in 1992 and earned three career ATP titles. In doubles, he was ranked no. 11 in 1997 and earned 13 titles. He was a finalist in the French Open in 1995 and the US Open in 1997, as well as a semifinalist at Wimbledon in 2000. He played his last career match in Stockholm in November partnering Jared Palmer.
  Richey Reneberg (born 5 October 1965 in Phoenix, Arizona) He turned professional in 1987 and reached his career-high singles ranking of no. 20 in 1991. He earned 3 singles titles and 19 doubles titles. He was ranked no. 1 in doubles in 1993 and played his last match in Bermuda in April partnering Jim Grabb.
  Javier Sánchez (born 1968 in Pamplona, Spain) He turned professional in 1986 and reached his career-high ranking of no. 23 in 1994. He reached the quarterfinals at the US Open in 1991 and 1996 and earned four career singles titles. In doubles, he was ranked no. 9 in 1990 and earned 26 career titles. He played his last match in Bogotá in March partnering Tomás Carbonell.
  Mark Woodforde (born 23 September 1965 in Adelaide, Australia) He turned professional in 1984 and reached a career-high ranking of world no. 19 in singles and no. 1 in doubles. He won four singles titles and 67 men's doubles titles, including the Australian Open twice (1992 and 1997), the French Open once (2000), Wimbledon six times (1993, 1994, 1995, 1996, 1997, and 2000), the US Open three times (1989, 1995, and 1996), and the year-end finals twice (1992 and 1996). He won a gold medal in men's doubles at the 1996 Olympics and a silver in 2000. He also earned five mixed doubles Grand Slam titles: Australia in 1992 and 1996, French in 1992, Wimbledon in 1993, and the US Open in 1992.

See also 
 2000 WTA Tour
 Association of Tennis Professionals
 International Tennis Federation

References 
General

 
 
 

Specific

External links 
 Association of Tennis Professionals (ATP) official website
 International Tennis Federation (ITF) official website

 
ATP Tour
ATP Tour seasons